Hindisheim is a commune in the Bas-Rhin department in Alsace in north-eastern France.

Agriculture retains a leading role in the local economy.

Geography
The village is positioned some twenty kilometres (twelve miles) to the south of Strasbourg, beside the little River Andlau.

Landmarks
 Chapel of the Virgin Mary (fifteenth century).  Unusually even in Alsace, this features a half timbered bell tower.
 Church of Saints Peter and Paul (nineteenth century).  The church contains a Rinckenbach organ (1922).

See also
 Communes of the Bas-Rhin department

References

External links
 Official website of the commune of Hindisheim

Communes of Bas-Rhin
Bas-Rhin communes articles needing translation from French Wikipedia